The 1950–51 Cypriot Cup was the 14th edition of the Cypriot Cup. A total of 8 clubs entered the competition. It began on 14 January 1951 with the quarterfinals and concluded on 25 February 1951 with the replay final which was held at GSP Stadium. APOEL won their 4th Cypriot Cup trophy after beating EPA 7–0 in the final.

Format 
In the 1950–51 Cypriot Cup, participated all the teams of the Cypriot First Division.

The competition consisted of three knock-out rounds. In all rounds each tie was played as a single leg and was held at the home ground of the one of the two teams, according to the draw results. Each tie winner was qualifying to the next round. If a match was drawn, extra time was following. If extra time was drawn, there was a replay match.

Quarter-finals

Semi-finals

Final 

Abandoned at the initial stage due to rain

Replay final

Sources

Bibliography

See also 
 Cypriot Cup
 1950–51 Cypriot First Division

Cypriot Cup seasons
1950–51 domestic association football cups
1950–51 in Cypriot football